Radio Romania International (or ) is a Romanian radio station owned by the Romanian public radio broadcaster Societatea Română de Radiodifuziune (SRR, the national public radio in Romania) that broadcasts abroad. Prior to 1989, the station was known as Radio Bucharest.

According to the Romanian law nr. 41/1994, republished, the SRR produces and broadcasts programmes in the Romanian language and other languages, for worldwide auditorium, to promote the image of Romania, and her internal and external politics. As a result, inside the SRR there is Departamentul Radio România Internaţional (Department Radio Romania International), which owns two radio stations.

Stations
As of March 2001, RRI 1 has broadcast daily shows under the heading “Romania Live”, a summary of the shows produced by the main departments in the Romanian Radio Broadcasting Corporation. This summary is broadcast around the clock via the satellite, on the Internet (in RealAudio), and also on short waves (to Central and Western Europe and Israel), 8 hours per day. RRI 1 has daily broadcasts around the clock in Romanian, and three 30 minute-broadcasts in the Aromanian dialect.

RRI 2 produces and broadcasts shows under the heading "Radio Bridges" in twelve foreign languages: Arabic, Aromanian, Chinese, English, French, German, Hebrew, Italian, Serbian, Spanish, Russian and Ukrainian, which total 25.5 hours per day.

People can listen to the programmes on mediumwave, shortwave, and FM, in addition to satellite. RRI has 51 hours of radio programme every day, which amounts to more than 18,600 hours of radio production in every year.

Broadcasts
RRI continues to use the analog and digital shortwave Digital Radio Mondiale. RRI broadcasts on shortwave with 300 kW from Galbeni, Tiganesti and with 100 kW from Săftica in Romania.

 English Language Broadcasts (UTC):

 0000–0100 Freq[kHz]: 7375, 9550
 0300–0400 Freq[kHz]: 15330, 11825, 7375, 9850
 0530–0600 Freq[kHz]: 7325, 17760, 21550
 1100–1200 Freq[kHz]: 15320, 17670, 13750, 15130
 1700–1800 Freq[kHz]: 9760, 11850, 9500, 11875
 2030–2100 Freq[kHz]: 7315, 11850, 13650, 9740
 2100–2200 Freq[kHz]: 13750, 11650
 2200–2300 Freq[kHz]: 9790, 7325, 5945, 7310

 Romanian Language Broadcasts (UTC):

 0000–0200 Freq[kHz]: 	5.910 ; 7.420
 0400-0500 Freq[kHz]:  6.145 ; 7.220 DRM
 0700–0800 Freq[kHz]: 15.200 ; 17.560  15.430 ; 17.750
 0800–0900 Freq[kHz]: 15.200 ; 17.640  15.430 ; 17.750
 0900–1000 Freq[kHz]: 15.200 ; 17.640  15.260 ; 17.800
 1200–1300 Freq[kHz]:  9.570
 1300–1500 Freq[kHz]: 15.370 ; 17.790
 1600–1700 Freq[kHz]:  7.370 ;  9.810
 1700–2000 Freq[kHz]: 11.820 ; 15.160

Hours valid for the winter from October 30 to, 2022 and March 26 to 2023.

RRI broadcasts through the Eutelsat 16A satellite at 11512 MHz, vertical polarization, azimuth 16 degrees east, signal speed: 29,950 MSym / s, Standard: DVB-S2, Modulation: 8PSK, Audio PID 510. The satellite transmits unencrypted signals of RRI channels for Europe.

On the Internet, you can listen to the programs in mp3 format on the

Bibliography

References

External links
 Radio Romania International Website multilanguages
 Radio Romania International Live on SoundCloud

International broadcasters
Radio stations in Romania
Romanian-language radio stations
Radio stations established in 1927
International
Aromanians in Romania